Problem Child in House is a South Korean variety program that airs on KBS2 starting November 7, 2018. The program also airs on KBS World with English subtitles.

Synopsis
In this quiz show, the five hosts and the guest(s) put their general knowledge to the test. They must correctly answer ten trivia questions given by the production team before they are allowed to leave the rooftop. They are not allowed to use their phones to find the answers on the internet.

Changes in running time

Cast

Current

Former

Special MC

List of episodes

Series overview

2018

2019

2020

2021

2022

2023

Rating 
 Ratings listed below are the individual corner ratings of Problem Child in House. (Note: Individual corner ratings do not include commercial time, which regular ratings include.)

Notes

Awards and nominations

References

External links 
 Official website 
 
 Problem Child in House at Naver 

Korean Broadcasting System
South Korean variety television shows
South Korean television shows
Korean-language television shows
2018 South Korean television series debuts
Pages with unreviewed translations